Silver Star Provincial Park is a Class C provincial park in British Columbia, Canada, located northeast of the city of Vernon in the Shuswap Highland of the Monashee Mountains.

See also
Silver Star Mountain Resort

References

External links

Provincial parks in the Okanagan
Monashee Mountains
Provincial parks of British Columbia
Protected areas established in 1940
1940 establishments in British Columbia